Looking for Lucky is a 2018 Chinese comedy drama film directed by Jiang Jiacheng, starring Ding Xinhe, Da Bing, Dong Lifan, Dong Longbin, Jia Tianming and Huang Jingxin.

Cast
 Ding Xinhe as Guangsheng
 
 Da Bing
 Dong Lifan
 Dong Longbin
 Jia Tianming
 Huang Jingxin

Reception
Elizabeth Kerr of The Hollywood Reporter wrote that "Jiang’s gentle satire is really allowed to blossom with the time it is given to breathe during those long takes, a mature creative choice for a young filmmaker to make. It was the right one this time around, and it effortlessly immerses viewers into the story’s opportunistic environment."

Sarah Ward of Screen Daily gave the film a positive review and wrote, "Brimming with aesthetic confidence, emotional candour and thematic conviction, Looking for Lucky certainly isn’t looking for a voice, a style or something to say, marking its guiding hand as a talent to watch."

References

External links
 
 

Chinese comedy-drama films
2018 comedy-drama films